Roselyn Bakery was a major bakery chain that distributed products from an Indianapolis central baking facility from 1943 to 1999.  The bakery chain, which consisted of approximately 40 locations in and around central Indiana, was known for its popular treats such as their Sweetheart Coffee Cake, Zebra Square Brownies and Blackout Cake.

In July 1999, the factory was abruptly shut down by the Indiana State Department of Health for repeated/severe code violations.  The entire chain was dissolved soon after.

Despite the closure being heavily publicized by the local media, the popularity of Roselyn Bakeries' products did not wane.  In 2000, the Kroger grocery chain sold a limited-edition cookbook of the bakery's recipes. (Reprints of the cookbook have since been made available at Roselyn Recipe, the bakery's official website.) At the same time, a bakery in Chicago was contracted to produce a limited number of bakery products for distribution at local supermarkets.

In 2005, the Dias family, along with another partner, purchased Roselyn Recipe and the assets of Roselyn Bakery from the Clark family (the bakery's original founders). Two bakeries were established, one in St. Louis and the other in Indianapolis, to continue the production and distribution of these products. Roselyn Recipe treats can be found and purchased in Kroger stores all over central Indiana.

References

External links

A brief history of Roselyn Bakeries at historicindianapolis.com

Bakeries of the United States
1943 establishments in Indiana
1999 disestablishments in Indiana